IEEE 1675-2008 was a standard for broadband over power lines developed by the IEEE Standards Association.  It provided electric utility companies with a comprehensive standard for safely installing hardware required for Internet access capabilities over their power lines.

The standard was published 7 January 2008. The IEEE 1901 standard was another related attempt published in 2011.

See also

Power line communication

External links
 
 IEEE P1675 Official site 

IEEE standards